Abedin Nepravishta was an Albanian politician and twice mayor of Tirana, Albania, during 1933-1935 and 1937-1939.

He was born in Libohovë, and went to Istanbul to follow the Imperial School of High Administration. He has served as major in different districts in Albania (Shkodër, Durres, Elbasan, Korçë, Dibër) under the reign of king Zog of Albania. 
He was the major who approved the first modern urbanistic city plan of Tirana as a capital city, designed by Arch. Armando Brasini, and began its application on site. He settled modern day's Tirana urbanistic plan, the plan which is still being applied today.

He was the commander of the armed forces that protected the delegates of the Congress of Lushnjë on 27 January 1920.

References

Albanian soldiers
Mayors of Tirana
People from Libohovë
Mekteb-i Mülkiye alumni
People from Janina vilayet
Year of birth missing
Year of death missing